Davide Bramati (born 28 June 1968, in Vaprio d'Adda) is a former Italian professional road bicycle racer who last rode at the UCI ProTeam level with the Quick-Step–Innergetic team, which he joined in 2003 debuting for them at the Tour Down Under in Australia.

He retired as a professional cyclist in 2006, when he began his new career of team manager. He currently holds this position with the Deceuninck–Quick-Step team of Patrick Lefevere.

Major results

1992
 1st, Stage 13, Volta a Portugal
1995
 3rd, Stage 16, Giro d'Italia
1996
 4th, Intergiro Competition, Giro d'Italia
1997
 1st, Stage 3, Giro del Trentino
1999
 1st, Stage 1, Vuelta a Murcia
2000
 1st, Stage 17, Vuelta a España
 2nd, Stage 12, Giro d'Italia
2002
 1st, Stage 4, Vuelta a Aragón
 2nd, Stage 13, Vuelta a España

External links 

1968 births
Living people
People from Vaprio d'Adda
Italian male cyclists
Cyclists from the Metropolitan City of Milan
Directeur sportifs